Nahuel Isaías Luján (born 23 August 1995) is an Argentine professional footballer who plays as a midfielder for Agropecuario on loan from Universidad de Chile.

Career
Luján began with Argentine Primera División side Belgrano, his debut for the club came on 11 May 2014 in a league draw with Arsenal de Sarandí. Two more appearances followed in the next two seasons for him before he left to join Primera B Nacional club Santamarina on loan. In his fifth game for Santamarina, Luján scored his first two career goals in a victory versus Ferro Carril Oeste. A year later, after eighteen games for both Santamarina and Belgrano, Luján joined Ferro Carril Oeste on loan for eighteen months. He went on to score four goals in forty matches in all competitions for Ferro Carril Oeste.

He was signed by Central Córdoba in August 2018.

In June 2022, he was loaned to Agropecuario from Universidad de Chile until the end of the year with an option to reloan.

Career statistics
.

References

External links

1995 births
Living people
Footballers from Córdoba, Argentina
Argentine footballers
Argentine expatriate footballers
Association football midfielders
Argentine Primera División players
Primera Nacional players
Chilean Primera División players
Club Atlético Belgrano footballers
Club y Biblioteca Ramón Santamarina footballers
Ferro Carril Oeste footballers
Central Córdoba de Santiago del Estero footballers
Universidad de Chile footballers
Club Agropecuario Argentino players
Expatriate footballers in Chile
Argentine expatriate sportspeople in Chile